The Roman Catholic Church in Malawi is composed of two ecclesiastical provinces and 6 suffragan dioceses.

List of dioceses

Episcopal Conference of Malawi

Ecclesiastical Province of Blantyre
Archdiocese of Blantyre
Diocese of Chikwawa
Diocese of Mangochi
Diocese of Zomba

Ecclesiastical Province of Lilongwe
Archdiocese of Lilongwe
Diocese of Dedza
Diocese of Karonga
Diocese of Mzuzu

External links 
Catholic-Hierarchy entry.
GCatholic.org.

Malawi
Catholic dioceses